Himalotrechodes insignis is a species of beetle in the family Carabidae, the only species in the genus Himalotrechodes.

References

Trechinae